Huernia guttata is a species of flowering plant in the family Apocynaceae, native to the southern Cape Provinces of South Africa. A succulent, it has gained the Royal Horticultural Society's Award of Garden Merit.

References

guttata
Endemic flora of South Africa
Flora of the Cape Provinces
Plants described in 1812